The Jang Bogo Station in Terra Nova Bay, Antarctica is a permanent South Korean research station. It is the second base of South Korean Antarctic research mission (after King Sejong Station), and the first that is located in mainland Antarctica. Completed in February 2014, the station houses 23 people in winter and 62 in summer in a 4000 square-metre building with three wings, and is one of the larger permanent bases in Antarctica.

The base, named after an eighth-century maritime ruler of Korea, is located in the Ross Dependency and near the Zucchelli Station of Italy. It was built by Hyundai Engineering and Construction, with material shipped from Busan to Lyttelton, New Zealand for transfer to the new Korean icebreaker, the RS Araon. For aeronautic operations such as the transport of personnel or cargo, the base is supported by the Italian Antarctic Program using the ice runway operated by  Zucchelli Station in Tethys Bay.

Jang Bogo Station opened on 12 February 2014. A dedication ceremony was held for it by the Ministry of Oceans and Fisheries.

See also
 List of Antarctic research stations
 List of Antarctic field camps
King Sejong Station, the first South Korean research mission in Antarctica, completed in 1988.

References

 
 Antarctic oil sets up cold war by Michael Field in the Sunday Star-Times (New Zealand) of 18 September 2011, page A13.

Outposts of Antarctica
Outposts of the Ross Dependency
South Korea and the Antarctic
2014 establishments in Antarctica